The Findlay Baronetcy, of Aberlour in the County of Banff, was a title in the Baronetage of the United Kingdom. He was the eldest son of John Ritchie Findlay. He was succeeded by his eldest son, the second Baronet. He sat as member of parliament for Banffshire. On his death the title passed to his younger brother, the third Baronet.

James Leslie Findlay, younger brother of the first Baronet, was an architect.

Findlay baronets, of Aberlour (1925)
Sir John Ritchie Findlay, 1st Baronet (1866–1930)
Sir (John) Edmund Ritchie Findlay, 2nd Baronet (1902–1962)
Sir Roland Lewis Findlay, 3rd Baronet (1903–1979)

References

Extinct baronetcies in the Baronetage of the United Kingdom
Ritchie Findlay family